The 2022 Tournoi de France was the 2nd edition of the Tournoi de France, an international women's football tournament, consisting of a series of friendly games, that was held in France from 16 to 22 February 2022. The four national teams involved in the tournament registered a squad of 23 players.

The age listed for each player is on 16 February 2022, the first day of the tournament. The numbers of caps and goals listed for each player do not include any matches played after the start of tournament. The club listed is the club for which the player last played a competitive match prior to the tournament. The nationality for each club reflects the national association (not the league) to which the club is affiliated. A flag is included for coaches that are of a different nationality than their own national team.

Squads

Brazil
Coach:  Pia Sundhage

The 23-player squad was announced on 1 February 2022. Two weeks later, Júlia and Bia Zaneratto withdrew from the squad due to COVID-19 and Ludmila, Ana Vitória, and Lauren were called-up to replace them.

Finland
Coach:  Anna Signeul

The 22-player squad was announced on 8 February 2022. Two days later, Vilma Koivisto, Heidi Kollanen, and Amanda Rantanen were added to the squad. On 15 February 2022, Katariina Kosola was added to the squad. Two days later, it was confirmed that Emmi Alanen withdrew from the squad due to illness.

France
Coach: Corinne Diacre

The 25-player squad was announced on 8 February 2022.

Netherlands
Coach:  Mark Parsons

The 27-player squad was announced on 8 February 2022. The following week, Dominique Janssen, Jill Roord, Lynn Wilms, and Renate Jansen withdrew from the squad due to COVID-19 protocols and were replaced by Lisa Doorn, Chasity Grant, Kayleigh van Dooren, and Janou Levels.

Player representation

By club
Clubs with three or more players represented are listed.

By club nationality

By club federation

By representatives of domestic league

References

Tournoi de France (Women)